Truax is an unincorporated community located in the town of Union, Eau Claire County, Wisconsin, United States. Truax is located along the Union Pacific Railroad near the northwest border of Eau Claire.

History
The community was named for the Truax family, which owned land in the area.

Notes

Unincorporated communities in Eau Claire County, Wisconsin
Unincorporated communities in Wisconsin